Amylohyphus is a fungal genus in the family Stereaceae. It was circumscribed by Norwegian mycologist Leif Ryvarden in 1978 to contain the single crust fungus Amylohyphus africanus. The fungus, which grows as a thin crust on deciduous wood, has a light brown surface with smooth, yellowish margins. The spores produced by the fungus are cylindrical, thin-walled, and non-amyloid, measuring 12–15 by 5–7 μm. Amylohyphus africanus is found in Rwanda.

References

Fungi of Africa
Monotypic Russulales genera
Taxa named by Leif Ryvarden
Stereaceae